Amino acid dating is a dating technique used to estimate the age of a specimen in paleobiology, molecular paleontology, archaeology, forensic science, taphonomy, sedimentary geology and other fields.  This technique relates changes in amino acid molecules to the time elapsed since they were formed.

All biological tissues contain amino acids.  All amino acids except glycine (the simplest one) are optically active, having a stereocenter at their α-C atom. This means that the amino acid can have two different configurations, "D" or "L" which are mirror images of each other.  With a few important exceptions, living organisms keep all their amino acids in the "L" configuration.  When an organism dies, control over the configuration of the amino acids ceases, and the ratio of D to L moves from a value near 0 towards an equilibrium value near 1, a process called racemization.  Thus, measuring the ratio of D to L in a sample enables one to estimate how long ago the specimen died.

Factors affecting racemization
The rate at which racemization proceeds depends on the type of amino acid and on the average temperature, humidity, acidity (pH), and other characteristics of the enclosing matrix. Also, D/L concentration thresholds appear to occur as sudden decreases in the rate of racemization. These effects restrict amino acid chronologies to materials with known environmental histories and/or relative intercomparisons with other dating methods.

Temperature and humidity histories of microenvironments are being produced at ever increasing rates as technologies advance and technologists accumulate data. These are important for amino acid dating because racemization occurs much faster in warm, wet conditions compared to cold, dry conditions. Temperate to cold region studies are much more common than tropical studies, and the steady cold of the ocean floor or the dry interior of bones and shells have contributed most to the accumulation of racemization dating data. As a rule of thumb, sites with a mean annual temperature of 30 °C have a maximum range of 200 ka and resolution of about 10 ka; sites at 10 °C have a maximum age range of ~2 Ma, and resolution generally about 20% of the age; at -10 °C the reaction has a maximum age of ~10 Ma, and a correspondingly coarser resolution.

Strong acidity and mild to strong alkalinity induce greatly increased racemization rates. Generally, they are not assumed to have a great impact in the natural environment, though tephrochronological data may shed new light on this variable.

The enclosing matrix is probably the most difficult variable in amino acid dating. This includes racemization rate variation among species and organs, and is affected by the depth of decomposition, porosity, and catalytic effects of local metals and minerals.

Amino acids used
Conventional racemization analysis tends to report a D-alloisoleucine / L-isoleucine (A/I or D/L ratio). This amino acid ratio has the advantages of being relatively easy to measure and being chronologically useful through the Quaternary.

Reversed phase HPLC techniques can measure up to 9 amino acids useful in geochronology over different time scales on a single chromatogram (aspartic acid, glutamic acid, serine, alanine, arginine, tyrosine, valine, phenylalanine, leucine).

In recent years there have been successful efforts to examine intra-crystalline amino acids separately as they have been shown to improve results in some cases.

Applications

Data from the geochronological analysis of amino acid racemization has been building for thirty-five years. Archeology, stratigraphy, oceanography, paleogeography, paleobiology, and paleoclimatology have been particularly affected. Their applications include dating correlation, relative dating, sedimentation rate analysis, sediment transport studies, conservation paleobiology,  taphonomy and time-averaging, sea level determinations, and thermal history reconstructions.

Paleobiology and archaeology have also been strongly affected. Bone, shell, and sediment studies have contributed much to the paleontological record, including that relating to hominoids. Verification of radiocarbon and other dating techniques by amino acid racemization and vice versa has occurred. The 'filling in' of large probability ranges, such as with radiocarbon reservoir effects, has sometimes been possible. Paleopathology and dietary selection, paleozoogeography and indigeneity, taxonomy and taphonomy, and DNA viability studies abound. The differentiation of cooked from uncooked bone, shell, and residue is sometimes possible. Human cultural changes and their effects on local ecologies have been assessed using this technique.

The slight reduction in this repair capability during aging is important to studies of longevity and old age tissue breakdown disorders, and allows the determination of age of living animals.

Amino acid racemization also has a role in tissue and protein degradation studies, particularly useful in developing museum preservation methods. These have produced models of protein adhesive and other biopolymer deteriorations and the concurrent pore system development.

Forensic science can use this technique to estimate the age of a cadaver or an objet d'art to determine authenticity.

Procedure
Amino acid racemization analysis consists of sample preparation, isolation of the amino acid wanted, and measure of its D:L ratio. Sample preparation entails the identification, raw extraction, and separation of proteins into their constituent amino acids, typically by grinding followed by acid hydrolysis. The amino acid derivative hydrolysis product can be combined with a chiral specific fluorescent, separated by chromatography or electrophoresis, and the particular amino acid D:L ratio determined by fluorescence. Alternatively, the particular amino acid can be separated by chromatography or electrophoresis, combined with a metal cation, and the D:L ratio determined by mass spectrometry. Chromatographic and electrophoretic separation of proteins and amino acids is dependent upon molecular size, which generally corresponds to molecular weight, and to a lesser extent upon shape and charge.

References

External links

Active laboratories
Northern Arizona University Amino Acid Geochronology Laboratory 
University of Massachusetts Amino Acid Geochronology Laboratory
The University of Colorado Amino Acid Geochronology Lab
University of Delaware Research Group
University of York BioArCh
Madrid School of Mines Biomolecular Stratigraphy Laboratory

Dating methods
Geochronological dating methods